The artists of the Tudor court are the painters and limners engaged by the monarchs of England's Tudor dynasty and their courtiers between 1485 and 1603, from the reign of Henry VII to the death of Elizabeth I.

Typically managing a group of assistants and apprentices in a workshop or studio, many of these artists produced works across several disciplines, including portrait miniatures, large-scale panel portraits on wood, illuminated manuscripts, heraldric emblems, and elaborate  decorative schemes for masques, tournaments, and other events.

Although there were English artists throughout the period, many artists were foreigners, especially from the Low Countries, but also from Italy and Germany. Some only stayed for short periods, but many for several years or the rest of their lives.

Isolation and iconography 

The Tudor period was one of unusual isolation from European trends for England.  At the start the Wars of the Roses had greatly disrupted artistic activity, which apart from architecture had reached a very low ebb by 1485. The Yorkist dynasty overthrown by the Tudors had been very close to their Burgundian allies, and English diplomats had their portraits painted by the finest Early Netherlandish painters – Edward Grimston by Petrus Christus and Sir John Donne by Hans Memling (both National Gallery, London).  However these were both painted abroad.  In the Tudor period foreign artists were recruited and often welcomed lavishly by the English court, as they were in other artistically marginal parts of Europe like Spain or Naples. The Netherlandish painters remained predominant, though French influence was also important on both Lucas Horenbout and Nicholas Hilliard, respectively the founder and the greatest exponent of the distinctively English tradition of the portrait miniature.

With the virtual extinction of religious painting at the Reformation, and little interest in classical mythology until the very end of the period, the portrait was the most important form of painting for all the artists of the Tudor court, and the only one to have survived in any numbers.  How many of these have also been lost can be seen from Holbein's book (nearly all pages in the Royal Collection) containing preparatory drawings for portraits – of eighty-five drawings, only a handful have surviving Holbein paintings, though often copies have survived.  Portraiture ranged from the informal miniature, almost invariably painted from life in the course of a few days and intended for private contemplation, to the later large-scale portraits of Elizabeth I such as the Rainbow Portrait, filled with symbolic iconography in dress, jewels, background, and inscription.

Much energy was also expended on decorative painting of fixtures and fittings, often of a very temporary nature.  In theory the "Serjeant Painters" of the King, a lower rank of painter, did most of this, probably to the designs of the more elevated "King's Painters" (or Queen's), but it is clear that they too spent time on this, as did court artists all over Europe (see Royal Entry). There was also the Master of the Revels, whose Office was responsible for festivals and tournaments, and no doubt called upon the artists and Serjeant Painters for assistance.

Jewellery and metalwork were regarded as extremely important, and far more was spent on them than on painting. Holbein produced many spectacular designs for now-vanished table ornaments in precious metals, and Hilliard was also a practising goldsmith.  The main artistic interests of Henry VIII were music, building palaces and tapestry, of which he had over 2,000 pieces, costing far more than he ever spent on painters.  The Flemish set with the Story of Abraham still at Hampton Court Palace is one grand set from late in his reign.

Elizabeth spent far less, hardly building anything herself, but took a personal interest in painting, keeping her own collection of miniatures locked away, wrapped in paper on which she wrote the names of the sitter. She is reputed to have had paintings of her burnt that did not match the iconic image she wished to be shown.

The most progressive and spectacular palace of the Tudor period, Nonsuch Palace, begun by Henry VIII in 1538 a little way south of London, was covered inside and out with prodigious quantities of figurative sculpted stucco reliefs – the whole scheme covered over 2,000 square metres (21,000 sq ft).  There was also probably much decorative painting.  As for the similar work at the Château de Fontainebleau, which Nonsuch was certainly intended to compete with, and outshine, Italians were brought in to provide authentic Mannerist work, however much the general plan remains English. The scattered fragments and images that have survived suggest that the awestruck accounts of visitors were not exaggerated.

A community of artists 

Many of the artists active at the Tudor court were connected by ties of family, marriage, and training.  Lucas Horenbout (often called Hornebolt in England), who began painting and illuminating for Henry VIII in the mid-1520s, was accompanied in his workshop by his sister Susannah, who was also an illuminator. It is generally accepted that Lucas Horenbout taught Hans Holbein the Younger the techniques of painting miniatures on vellum when Holbein was engaged by Henry VIII in the early 1530s.

Lucas and Susanna Horenbout's father, Gerard Horenbout - possibly he was the Master of James IV of Scotland - was an active member of the Ghent-Bruges school of manuscript illustrators and also was employed briefly at the Tudor court. In Bruges, Gerard was associated with Sanders Bening or Benninck and his son Simon, with whom he worked on the illustrations for the Grimani Breviary.  Simon Bening's eldest daughter Levina Teerlinc was also trained as an illuminator.  She entered the service of Henry VIII at the close of 1546 following the deaths of Holbein (1543) and Lucas Horenbout (1544), and would remain as court painter to Henry's son Edward VI and as painter and lady-in-waiting to both his daughters, Mary I and Elizabeth.  Levina Teerlinc, in turn, taught the art of limning to Nicholas Hilliard, an apprentice goldsmith who would marry the daughter of Queen Elizabeth's jeweller and rise to become the supreme miniaturist of the age. John Bettes the Elder apprenticed his son, John the Younger to Hilliard.  Hilliard's most famous student, Isaac Oliver, later limner to Anne of Denmark and Henry, Prince of Wales, was married to the niece of Marcus Gheeraerts the Younger.  Gheeraerts was also the brother-in-law of Lucas de Heere's apprentice John de Critz the Elder, who took the dynasty into the Stuart period, and was succeeded as Serjeant-Painter by his son.  De Heere was also a religious refugee from Flanders; although the upheavals of the Protestant Reformation acted to reduce artistic contacts, especially with Italy, England could also benefit from them.

Residents 

 Meynnart Wewyck (Maynard Vewicke), resident ca. 1502–1525, painter of "pictours" or panel portraits to both Henry VII and Henry VII.
 Lucas Horenbout, pioneer of the portrait miniature, King's Painter from 1531 until his death in 1544
 Anthony Toto and Bartolommeo Penni - see below
 Hans Holbein the Younger, spent many years on two visits, painting the best portraits of the Tudor period
 Levina Teerlinc, miniaturist and lady-in-waiting
 John Bettes the Elder, engaged for decorative work at Whitehall from 1531 to 1533; also a portrait-painter and miniaturist
 Gerlach Flicke, or "Garlicke" in some English records, German portraitist, in London from c. 1545 until his death in 1558.
 Hans Eworth, in England from c. 1549; portrait-painter and recorded as a designer for the Office of the Revels
 Steven van Herwijck, portrait medallist, visited 1562, resident 1565 until his death in 1567.
 Steven van der Meulen, arrived by 1561, naturalized 1562, active until his death in 1563
 Marcus Gheeraerts the Younger, Flemish Protestant refugee portraitist, who arrived as a child
 George Gower, English portraitist 
 Nicholas Hilliard, miniaturist and goldsmith to Elizabeth I from c. 1572
 Hieronimo Custodis, Flemish exile portraitist active from 1589 until his death in 1593 
 Sir William Segar, portraitist and herald; later Garter Principal King of Arms 1607–1633
 John de Critz the Elder, arrived from Flanders as a child, portraitist
 Robert Peake the Elder, English portraitist; also employed by the Office of the Revels; later serjeant painter under James I
 Isaac Oliver, Hilliard's pupil and later rival
 Rowland Lockey, another apprentice of Hilliard

Visitors 

 Pietro Torrigiano, Florentine sculptor, on the run after breaking Michelangelo's nose, made Henry VII's tomb and other monuments in an extended stay. With Mazzoni, a rare portrait sculptor at the Tudor court.
 Possibly Guido Mazzoni, Florentine sculptor mostly in painted terracotta. He submitted alternative designs for Henry's tomb, and a painted terracotta bust by him may be of Henry VIII as a boy.
 Michael Sittow probably painted Henry VII and a picture of Catherine of Aragon for her mother, his employer
 Possibly the Venetian Antonio Solario, who certainly painted an altarpiece for a London merchant in 1514
 Girolamo da Treviso, hired mainly as a military engineer (who died in action), but also left a significant painting
 Nicolas Bellin, or Niccolo da Modena, brought in from Fontainebleau for Nonsuch Palace
 Lucas Cornelisz. de Cock (1495–1552) Dutch portrait and history painter, probably in England c. 1527–1532, before leaving for Italy
 William or Guillim Scrots, employed by Henry VIII from at least 1545 and retained by Edward VI until the king died in 1553
 Antonis Mor or Antonio Moro, the Habsburg portraitist, visited with Philip II of Spain
 Marcus Gheeraerts the Elder a Flemish Protestant refugee, stayed nine years, and returned in 1585 until his death sometime before 1589 
 Quentin Metsys the Younger or Massys
 Cornelius Ketel stayed eight years, painting histories and portraits
 Lucas de Heere Protestant refugee who returned to Flanders after ten years, when it was safe to do so
 Joris Hoefnagel, in England c. 1569–71 making drawings for Civitates Orbis Terrarum; painted A Fête at Bermondsey while in England
 Federico Zuccari visited for six months, painting Elizabeth and Leicester

The Tudor Serjeant Painters

The holders of the office were:

John Browne, heraldic painter since 1502, appointed "King's Painter" in 1511/12, and as the first Serjeant Painter in 1527, when the imported artist Lucas Horenbout took over as "King's Painter" - now the superior position.  Browne died in office in December 1532.
Andrew Wright, 1532–1544, about whom little is known
"Antony Toto", really Antonio di Nunziato d'Antonio, a Florentine pupil of Ridolfo Ghirlandajo, from 1544, who died in office in 1554.  He was the first Serjeant Painter who can be evidenced as an artist rather than an artisan. None of his paintings are known to survive, but his New Year gifts to Henry, presumably his own work, are documented as including a Calumny of Apelles (1538/39) and a Story of King Alexander (1540/41), and then in 1552 a portrait of a duke "steyned upon cloth of silver" for Edward VI.  He had a Florentine colleague Bartolommeo Penni, brother of the much more distinguished Gianfrancesco, Raphael's right-hand man, and Luca, a member of the School of Fontainebleau.  Both probably came to Henry from Cardinal Wolsey, as they first appear in the accounts just after Wolsey's fall in October 1529.  "Toto" had been signed on in Florence in 1519 as an assistant to Pietro Torrigiano, who in fact left England for good later that year.  Toto and Penni spent most of their time after 1538 working on Nonsuch Palace, including elaborate stucco work for Henry's most advanced building, now vanished.
Nicolas Lizard (or Lisory), a French artist, held the post from 1554 to his death in 1571
William Herne or Heron, 1572 to 1580
George Gower 1581 until his death in 1596
Leonard Fryer 1596–1607, about whom very little is known, joined after the death of Elizabeth by
 John de Critz the Elder from 1603.

Identification and attribution 

Many surviving images have been badly worn over the years, or incompetently "restored". Inscriptions are often later than the paintings themselves, and may reflect wishful thinking; many anonymous Tudor ladies were identified as "Mary I", or, especially, one or other of Henry VIII's queens, by the owners of pictures.  Anne Boleyn in particular has been said to be the subject of dozens of pictures; even now there is no certain image of her done from life, and the most plausible, is a later copy and among the least informative.  The only probable portrait of Catherine Howard, a miniature by Holbein in the Royal Collection, is only identified by circumstantial evidence (see Gallery).

A well-known painting (left) was identified by George Vertue in 1727 as Lady Frances Brandon and her second husband Adrian Stokes, an attribution that stood unquestioned until the sitters were properly identified as Mary Nevill, Baroness Dacre and her son Gregory Fiennes, 10th Baron Dacre and the artist as Hans Eworth in 1986.

Attribution to artists is even more challenging; not all artists signed their work, and those who did may not have done so consistently.  Many pictures have been cut down, extended, or otherwise altered in ways that damage or destroy inscriptions.  Artists' workshops often churned out copies of the master's work to meet the demand for portraits, as symbols of devotion to the Crown or simply to populate the fashionable "long galleries" lined with portraits.

Today, attributions are made on the basis of style, sitter, accepted date, and related documentation such as receipts or bills for payment and inventories of collections or estates.  It is now generally accepted that the artist known as "The Monogrammist HE" is Hans Eworth, but other identifications remain elusive.  Some of the most well-known images of the period, such as the portrait of Elizabeth I when a Princess, age 13, have been attributed to many artists over the years, but remain cautiously labelled "?Flemish School" in recent catalogues.  Much scholarly debate also circles around identification of possible portraits of Lady Jane Grey.

Payments
The royal accounts for the period survive, but are not always easy to interpret. Payments often covered expensive materials, and in many cases the wages of assistants had to be paid out of them. Some regular annuities, usually supplemented by payments for specific works, are given below.  But recipients were expected to give works to the monarch, at New Year or on their birthday.

Royal annuities:
Meynnart Wewyck (as "olde maynerd wewoke paynter"), half-yearly payment of 100 shillings in 1525
Lucas Hornebolte (scholarly dissention) £33 6s or £62 10s from 1525 "until his death"
Hans Holbein £30 (but he did more work outside the court)
Levina Teerlinc £40
Nicholas Hilliard received £400 as a gift in 1591, and an annuity of £40 from 1599; he typically charged £3 for a non-royal miniature.

The sums spent on metalwork, building palaces, and by Henry on tapestries, dwarfed these figures.

Galleries

Miniatures

Preparatory drawings

Panel paintings

Paintings on canvas

Notes

References

Citations

Sources 
 Hearn, Karen, ed. Dynasties: Painting in Tudor and Jacobean England 1530–1630.  New York: Rizzoli, 1995.   (Hearn 1995)
 Hearn, Karen: Insiders or outsiders? Foreign-born artists at the Jacobean court, in From strangers to citizens: the integration of immigrant communities in Britain, Ireland, and colonial America, 1550–1750, ed. Randolph Vigne, Charles Littleton, Huguenot Society of Great Britain and Ireland, Sussex Academic Press, 2001, Google books (Hearn 2001)
 Hearn, Karen: Marcus Gheeraerts II : Elizabethan artist. London: Tate Publications. . . (Hearn 2002)
 Holbein and the Court of Henry VIII : the Queen's Gallery, Buckingham Palace, 1978–1979. London: Queen's Gallery, 1979.
 Honig, Elizabeth: "In Memory: Lady Dacre and Pairing by Hans Eworth" in Renaissance Bodies: The Human Figure in English Culture c. 1540–1660 edited by Lucy Gent and Nigel Llewellyn, Reaktion Books, 1990, 
 Kinney, Arthur F.: Nicholas Hilliard's "Art of Limning", Northeastern University Press, 1983, 
 Kipling, Gordon: "Henry VII and the Origins of Tudor Patronage" in Patronage in the Renaissance edited by Guy Fitch Lytle and Stephen Orgel, Princeton: Princeton University Press, 1982 .  (published online 2016). Retrieved 8 April 2019.
 Reynolds, Graham: Nicholas Hilliard & Isaac Oliver, Her Majesty's Stationery Office, 1971
 Strong, Roy,The English Icon: Elizabethan and Jacobean Portraiture, 1969, Routledge & Kegan Paul, London (Strong 1969)
 Strong, Roy: Nicholas Hilliard, 1975, Michael Joseph Ltd, London,  (Strong 1975)
 Strong, Roy: The Cult of Elizabeth, 1977, Thames and Hudson, London,  (Strong 1977)
 Strong, Roy: Artists of the Tudor Court: The Portrait Miniature Rediscovered 1520–1620, Victoria & Albert Museum exhibit catalogue, 1983,  (Strong 1983)
 Strong, Roy: "From Manuscript to Miniature" in John Murdoch, Jim Murrell, Patrick J. Noon & Roy Strong, The English Miniature, Yale University Press, New Haven and London, 1981 (Strong 1981)
 Strong, Roy: Gloriana: The Portraits of Queen Elizabeth I, Thames and Hudson, 1987,  (Strong 1987)
 Strong, Roy:. The Elizabethan image : an introduction to English portraiture, 1558 to 1603. New Haven. , . (Strong 2019)
 Town, Edward: "A Biographical Dictionary of London Painters, 1547–1625". The Volume of the Walpole Society, 2014, 76: 1–235.  (Town 2014)
 Town, Edward: "'A fête at Bermondsey': an English landscape by Marcus Gheeraerts the Elder", The Burlington Magazine, May 2015, 157 (1346): 309-317 (Town 2015)
 Town, Edward; David, Jessica: "George Gower: portraitist, Mercer, Serjeant Painter". The Burlington Magazine, 2020, 162 (1410): 731–747. (Town 2020)
 Waterhouse, Ellis: Painting in Britain, 1530–1790, 4th Edn, 1978, Penguin Books (now Yale History of Art series)

English Renaissance
Renaissance art
Tudor England
English monarchy
English art

15th century in England
16th century in England
17th century in England
Medieval English artists
Tudor
Lists of British artists
Portraits of the English royal family
Material culture of royal courts
English royal court